Linda  Larkin is an American actress, best known for her role as the speaking voice of Princess Jasmine in Disney's 1992 animated feature film Aladdin.

Career
Larkin began her career in 1990, with the film Zapped Again! as Joanne.

She became the voice of Princess Jasmine in the 1992 Disney film Aladdin. In order for her to voice Princess Jasmine, Disney required her to lower her voice as it was otherwise too high for the role.

Larkin has reprised the role as Jasmine in the sequels and various other media, including The Return of Jafar and Aladdin and the King of Thieves, as well as in the television series, House of Mouse, Sofia the First, and the Kingdom Hearts and Disney Infinity video game series.

For her work at Disney, Larkin was honored as a Disney Legend on August 19, 2011.

Personal life 
She has been married to actor and musician Yul Vazquez since 2002.

Filmography

Film

Television

Video games

References

External links

 Linda Larkin at the Disney Legends Website

20th-century American actresses
21st-century American actresses
Actresses from Los Angeles
American film actresses
American television actresses
American voice actresses
American video game actresses
Living people
Year of birth missing (living people)
Place of birth missing (living people)